The Sammarinese Union of Moderates (USDM) was a centre-right, Christian-democratic, national-conservative political coalition in San Marino.

It was founded on 21 February 2008 and consisted of the Christian-democratic Sammarinese Populars and the national-conservative Sammarinese National Alliance, after a new electoral law introduced a threshold of 3.5% (both parties were below that threshold in the 2006 general election).
In the 2008 general election Sammarinese Union of Moderates ran within the centrist Pact for San Marino coalition. The electoral coalition won 35 seats out of 60 in the Grand and General Council in the Sammarinese parliamentary election, 2008 gaining 54.22% of the national vote and a governmental majority of 5, becoming the new government of San Marino. The Sammarinese Union of Moderates itself gained 2 out seats and 4.17% of the national vote.

The coalition was disbanded after the disastrous election of 2012, where the alliance obtained solely 340 votes.

References

Defunct political party alliances in San Marino
Christian democratic parties in Europe
Sammarinese nationalism